Ivan Nikolayevich Volobuiev (born 5 January 1991) is a Russian ice dancer who competed with partner Valeria Starygina.

Career 
Early in his career, Volobuiev competed with Tatiana Baturintseva.

Volobuiev teamed up with Valeria Starygina in 2010. At the Russian Championships, they finished 7th in 2011 and 6th in 2012. Starygina and Volobuiev won gold at the 2011 Coupe de Nice and silver at the 2011 Istanbul Cup.

In the 2012–13 season, they won the silver medal at the 2012 Coupe de Nice.

Programs 
(with Starygina)

(with Baturintseva)

Competitive highlights

With Starygina

With Baturintseva

References

External links 
 
 

Russian male ice dancers
1991 births
Living people
Figure skaters from Moscow